Alexander Robert Lawton (November 4, 1818 – July 2, 1896) was a lawyer, politician, diplomat, and brigadier general in the Confederate States Army during the American Civil War.

Early life
Lawton was born in the Beaufort District of South Carolina. He was the son of Alexander James Lawton and Martha Mosse. He graduated from the United States Military Academy in 1839, placing 13th out of 31 in his class. He served as a second lieutenant in the 1st U.S. Artillery until resigning his commission in 1840 to study law. He attended the Harvard Law School, graduating in 1842. He settled in Savannah, Georgia, and entered the fields of law, railroad administration, and state politics.

Civil War
Lawton favored Georgia's secession and became colonel of the 1st Georgia Volunteers. He commanded the Savannah troops that seized Fort Pulaski, the first conflict of the war in Georgia. He was commissioned a brigadier general in the Confederate Army on April 13, 1861, and commanded the forces guarding Georgia's seacoast before being reassigned to Virginia. He led his brigade effectively during Stonewall Jackson's Shenandoah Valley Campaign, the Seven Days Battles, and the Second Battle of Bull Run (Second Manassas). His last field service was at the Battle of Antietam (Sharpsburg), where he commanded the division of the wounded Maj. Gen. Richard S. Ewell. Lawton was seriously wounded early in the morning of September 17, 1862, while defending his portion of the Army of Northern Virginia's line. Initially carried from the field to a temporary hospital, he spent months at home recuperating.

In August 1863, Lawton became the Confederacy's second Quartermaster-General. Although he brought energy and resourcefulness to the position, he was unable to solve the problem of material shortages and poorly regulated railroads.

Postbellum career
In the years after the Civil War, Lawton became increasingly important as a political figure in Georgia, serving in various administrative posts. He lost the 1880 election for the U.S. Senate in an election which seemed to represent a victory of the "New South" over the "Old South." He was chosen President of the American Bar Association in 1882. Five years later, he was appointed Minister to Austria-Hungary and left that post in 1889. Lawton died in Clifton Springs, New York.

See also

List of American Civil War generals (Confederate)
Battle of Fort Pulaski, Background, "Department of Georgia".

Notes

References
 Eicher, John H., and David J. Eicher, Civil War High Commands. Stanford: Stanford University Press, 2001. .
 Sifakis, Stewart. Who Was Who in the Civil War. New York: Facts On File, 1988. .
 Warner, Ezra J. Generals in Gray: Lives of the Confederate Commanders. Baton Rouge: Louisiana State University Press, 1959. .
 Appleton's Cyclopedia of American Biography, edited by James Grant Wilson and John Fiske. Six volumes, New York: D. Appleton and Company, 1887-1889.

External links

1818 births
1896 deaths
People from Beaufort County, South Carolina
Harvard Law School alumni
Confederate States Army brigadier generals
United States Military Academy alumni
People of Georgia (U.S. state) in the American Civil War
Presidents of the American Bar Association
Ambassadors of the United States to Austria-Hungary
People from Savannah, Georgia
19th-century American diplomats